Ehud R. Toledano is professor of Middle East history at Tel Aviv University and the current director of the Program in Ottoman & Turkish Studies. His areas of specialization are Ottoman history, and socio-cultural history of the modern Middle East.

Works 

Ehud R. Toledano, The Ottoman Slave Trade and Its Suppression 1840-1890, Princeton: Princeton University Press, 1982. 

Ehud R. Toledano, State and Society in Mid-Nineteenth-Century Egypt, Cambridge: Cambridge University Press, 1990. 

Ehud R. Toledano, Slavery and Abolition in the Ottoman Middle East, Seattle: University of Washington Press, 1998. 

Ehud R. Toledano, As If Silent and Absent: Bonds of Enslavement in the Islamic Middle East, New Haven, CT and London: Yale University Press, 2007.

References 

Year of birth missing (living people)
Place of birth missing (living people)
Living people
Academic staff of Tel Aviv University
Historians of the Middle East